Orchard School Bristol is a secondary school with academy status, located in Horfield in Bristol, England.

History

Orchard School opened for teaching in September 2005 and became an academy as part of Trust in Learning Academies in September 2012.

Orchard School opened on the site of the former Monks Park School.

Uniform 
Orchard School's student uniform consists of a white shirt with house tie, school blazer, black trousers or skirt and plain black shoes. House ties are smart black stripes on a red, blue, yellow or green tie.

Ofsted inspection
The school's latest inspection took place in May 2019 and was confirmed as Good in all areas.

Notable alumni
 Chris Lines – professional footballer

References

External links
Official website

Secondary schools in Bristol
Academies in Bristol